Sostis is a village and a former municipality in the Rhodope regional unit, East Macedonia and Thrace, Greece. Since the 2011 local government reform it is part of the municipality Iasmos, of which it is a municipal unit. The municipal unit has an area of 229.190 km2. The population was 6,334 in 2011.

References

Populated places in Rhodope (regional unit)

el:Δήμος Ιάσμου#Δημοτική ενότητα Σώστου